Kamil Patel (born 3 April 1979) is a Mauritian former professional tennis player.

Patel, a three-time gold medalist at the Indian Ocean Island Games, played Davis Cup for Mauritius between 2000 and 2007, for a team record 18 career wins. In 2010 he represented Mauritius at the Commonwealth Games in both singles and mixed doubles, reaching the quarter-finals of the latter. While competing on the professional tour he had best rankings of 570 in singles and 328 in doubles. He won two ITF Futures titles in doubles.

Since 2013 he has served as president of the Mauritius Tennis Federation. He retired from competition after the 2015 Indian Ocean Island Games, where he served as the Mauritian flag bearer.

ITF Futures titles

Doubles: (2)

References

External links
 
 
 

1979 births
Living people
Mauritian tennis players
Commonwealth Games competitors for Mauritius
Tennis players at the 2010 Commonwealth Games
Male tennis players